Gutbuster or Gutbusters may refer to:

Gutbusters (film),  a 2002 documentary following three competitors in the Nathan's International Hot Dog Eating Contest
The Gutbuster (race), an annual race up Baldwin Street, Dunedin — reputedly the world's steepest street
Gutbuster (professional wrestling), a type of throw